The 2000 United States Senate election in Virginia was held on November 7, 2000. Incumbent Democratic U.S. Senator Chuck Robb sought re-election to a third term, but he was defeated by Republican nominee George Allen. With Allen's victory, this marked the first time since 1988 that Republicans would hold both of Virginia's Senate seats. , this was the last time the Republicans won the Class 1 Senate seat in Virginia.

Candidates

Democratic 
 Chuck Robb, incumbent U.S. Senator and former Governor of Virginia

Republican 
 George Allen, former Governor of Virginia and former U.S. Representative

General election

Debates
Complete video of debate, September 24, 2000
Complete video of debate, September 25, 2000
Complete video of debate, October 22, 2000

Polling

Results

See also 
 2000 United States Senate elections

References

External links 
 Virginia State Board of Elections
 Campaign contributions at OpenSecrets.org

2000
Virginia
2000